The 2012 Košice Open was a professional tennis tournament played on clay courts. It was the tenth edition of the tournament which was part of the 2012 ATP Challenger Tour. It took place in Košice, Slovakia between 11 and 17 June 2012.

ATP entrants

Seeds

 1 Rankings are as of May 28, 2012.

Other entrants
The following players received wildcards into the singles main draw:
  Patrik Fabian
  Dominik Hrbatý
  Miloslav Mečíř Jr.
  Jiří Veselý

The following players received entry from the qualifying draw:
  Marius Copil
  Marcin Gawron
  Nils Langer
  Andrej Martin

Champions

Singles

 Aljaž Bedene def.  Simon Greul, 7–6(7–1), 6–2

Doubles

 Tomasz Bednarek /  Mateusz Kowalczyk def.  Uladzimir Ignatik /  Andrei Vasilevski, 2–6, 7–5, [14–12]

External links
Official website

Kosice Open
Košice Open
2012 in Slovak tennis